The Protestant Church is a church of the Dutch Reformed and Lutheran community in Oranjestad, Aruba. The church is not an official member of any international church organisation. The old church dates from 1846. In 1950, a new church was constructed next to the old church. The old church is the second oldest building of Oranjestad which still exists after Fort Zoutman.

History 
The majority of the population of Aruba were Roman Catholics, and there used to be no church for the Protestant community of Aruba. There was a gentlemen's agreement that the priests would perform baptisms and other rites, and inform the Lutheran or Dutch Reformed community in Curaçao. The Protestant community petitioned the States General of the Netherlands to open a church in Aruba.

In 1822, Karel van Eekhout was sent to Aruba as minister and schoolteacher. J.H.G. Eman was appointed as overseer for the Lutheran Church, and C. Specht for the Dutch Reformed Church. Together they purchased the house of the Arends family in 1822. On 25 August 1822, the first service was held. The church services were held in Papiamento. Van Eekhout had no formal education, and therefore was not allowed to perform sacrements. In 1830, he resigned, and it wasn't until 1839 when an ordained minister was appointed.

The house was too small and in a poor condition. In 1845, it was demolished, and a real church was constructed in its place. The congregation at the time was about 400 people. In 1867, a tower was added to the church.

In 1950, a new church was built next to the old church on the grounds of the former Doctor's House. The new church was inaugurated on 28 May 1950. and was designed by C.M. Bakker. In 2011, the congregation was 480 people. The services are still held in Papiamento.

In 1988, the old church was restored and is currently in use as exhibition and concert hall. It also houses the A. van den Doel Bible Museum.

A. van den Doel Bible Museum

The A. van den Doel Bible Museum is housed in the Old Protestant Church. The collections include old bibles, works of art, and other religious artifacts. It is named after Anthonie van den Doel who was minister of the church from 1983 until 2001.

References

Bibliography
 
 

Churches in Aruba
Buildings and structures in Oranjestad, Aruba
Churches completed in 1846
Dutch Reformed Church buildings
Lutheran church buildings in North America